An urban commercial bank or city-based commercial bank refers to a type of bank in China operating locally with significant shares from the local government. Founded as urban credit cooperatives in 1980s, it aimed to provide funds for local small and medium-sized enterprises and stimulate local economy.

There are currently 162 urban commercial banks operating across China. In 2017, the total assets and liabilities of all urban commercial banks combined was 31721.7 billion yuan, making up 12.70% of all Chinese banks. Typical examples include Bank of Beijing, Bank of Shanghai and Bank of Jiangsu.

History 
The first urban commercial bank was Shenzhen City Commercial Bank in 1995. In 1998, the central bank of China, People's Bank of China, advocated urban credit cooperative to change their names into urban commercial banks. 

Most city commercial banks have strong ties to their local government and are majority or wholly state owned. Since 2005 some city commercial banks diversify their shareholders, inviting Chinese and international private companies to take minority shares, merging and cross-shareholding. Some of the banks have listed their shares. 

Since 2008, an observable trend has emerged for city commercial banks to extend business beyond their home region. They are also often the main shareholder behind village and township banks (VTB). Taizhou City Commercial Bank, Bank of Beijing, Bank of Tianjin and Bank of Ningbo are examples for city commercial banks operating in such ways.

Notable urban commercial banks

References 

Banking in China
Cooperatives in China
Banks of China